24 is a 2016 Indian Tamil-language science fiction action film written and directed by Vikram Kumar. Based on the concept of time travel, the film stars actor Suriya in a triple role alongside Samantha Ruth Prabhu and Nithya Menen. In the film, Sethuraman a scientist invents a time traveler watch which leads to a bitter battle between his evil twin brother Athreya and his lookalike son Mani in the future.

The film's development dates back to 2009, at which time it was to star Vikram and Ileana D'Cruz. However, in February 2010, the project was dropped due to the difference in opinions between the director, producer, and actor, facing rejection of the refined script. In August 2014, Suriya agreed to produce and act in the film, with principal photography commencing in Mumbai in April 2015, continuing in Nasik, Goregaon and Pune. The second phase of filming was done in Poland by the end of September 2015. Filming was completed in Chennai by November 2015. Produced by 2D Entertainment, the film has cinematography by S. Tirru. The soundtrack and film score were composed by A. R. Rahman, with lyrics by Vairamuthu and Madhan Karky. 

The film (along with a dubbed Telugu version with the same title) was released on 6 May 2016. The film was a critical and commercial success, and won two awards at the 64th National Film Awards  Best Cinematography and Best Production Design. Suriya won the Critics Best Actor Award at the 64th Filmfare Awards.

Plot 
Sethuraman is a brilliant scientist and renowned watchmaker who lives with his wife Priya and newborn son Manikandan. He has devoted himself to inventing a time machine using a watch. In January 1990, Sethuraman manages to successfully complete his invention, although it was only capable of moving back and forth in time for 24 hours. His happiness is short-lived, however, as his evil twin brother Athreya attacks the family and kills Priya to get the watch. He manages to find the key to the box that the watch was hidden in, but not the box. Unable to use the watch and fearful for his son's life, an injured Sethuraman manages to escape with his son and gets on a train, with Athreya in close pursuit. Sethuraman pleads with a woman he met on the train named Sathyabhama to take care of his son and goes to face Athreya. He manages to trick Athreya into thinking he's carrying a bomb, prompting Athreya to quickly kill Sethuraman before jumping off the train to his apparent death.

26 years later, Manikandan (Mani) is now a talented watch mechanic who believes Sathyabhama to be his mother. It is revealed that Sethuraman placed the locked box containing his watch along with Mani, who grew up unaware of the contents of the box, as well as his true parents. Mani meets a girl Sathya and falls in love with her. Somewhere else, Athreya, who survived his fall and was in a coma, wakes up after 26 years and is shocked to find out that he is now paralysed from the waist down and significantly older. He is cared for by his trusted confidante, Mithran.

Through an incredible set of coincidences, the key to the box ends up in the hands of Mani, who unlocks the box and discovers the watch inside. He figures out its incredible capabilities including its ability to freeze time for 30 seconds, but questions the origin of the watch, and how it ended up in his possession.

Athreya, upset with the fact that he lost 26 years of his life and has become a paraplegic, obsesses over the watch and wishes to go back in time to relive his lost youth. Mithran issues an advertisement offering INR 5 crores (50 million) as a reward for the lost watch. Mani deduces that the creator of the advertisement is aware of the powers of the watch. In order to figure out the truth, Mani uses the original to make an identical copy and along with his friend, goes to the provided address.

At the office, Athreya spots Mani's copy among countless others and realises that Mani has the original watch. He summons both of them to the office and viciously attacks them, kills Mani, and gets hold of the watch. An ecstatic Athreya reverses time only to find out that the watch cannot transport its wearer beyond 24 hours, waking up at 12 am the night before. He now realises that Mani is the only one who can upgrade the watch. Since the day's events have reversed, Mani is still alive and their confrontation at the office is yet to occur. Athreya then decides to convince Mani that he is Sethuraman, and lie that he is dying from an incurable disease.

Now disguised as Sethuraman, Athreya finds Mani and tricks him to upgrade the watch to enable larger time jumps. Mani manages to successfully upgrade the watch but learns Athreya's true identity and the reason for his parent's death after finding an extra digit in his father's picture. Mani tricks Athreya into revealing the date of his parent's death and returns to 1990 to warn them. Sethuraman discovers the upgraded watch and realises that Mani has travelled back in time to warn them. Now prepared, Sethuraman manages to successfully use his watch to freeze time, kill Athreya and escape his henchmen. Priya asks Sethu to throw the watch away as she has had enough of the past to which he complies.

Sethu and Priya board the same train as Sathyabhama, and they start a conversation in which Sethu tells Sathyabama that he is a physics teacher to which she asked them to come and join her family's school as they want to hire a physics teacher. Sethu and Priya, for a fresh and happy start, agree to it. The film ends with a young Mani talking to a young Sathya.

Cast

 Suriya in a triple role as
Manikandan "Mani" aka Subramani, Sethuraman's son and Athreya's nephew, Sathya's love interest
Athreya, Sethuraman's older twin brother who wants to get hold of watch and Mani's biological paternal uncle
Sethuraman, Athreya's younger twin brother and a scientist who invented a time-travelling 24 watch and Mani's biological father
 Samantha Ruth Prabhu as Sathyabhama aka Sathya, Mani's love interest (voice dubbed by Chinmayi)
 Nithya Menen as Priya Sethuraman, Sethuraman's wife, and Mani's biological mother
 Saranya Ponvannan as Sathyabhama, Mani's adoptive mother
 Ajay as Mithran, Athreya's trusted sidekick
 Girish Karnad as Sathya's grandfather
 Mohan Raman as Sathya's father
 Sudha as Sathya's mother
 Sathyan as Saravanan, Mani's friend
 Charle as Reddiyar
 Appukutty as Reddiyar's staff
 Harsha Vardhan as Kalai, an electrician who works for Athreya
 Natarajan Balkrishna as Sathya's uncle
 T. S. Ranganathan as Sathya's uncle

Production

Pre-production 
In August 2009, director Vikram Kumar announced that he was set to direct a film titled 24. The film was backed by producer Mohan Natarajan, which would feature actor Vikram in a lead role. Harris Jayaraj was confirmed to score the music and P. C. Sreeram to handle the film cinematography. By late 2009, the filming commenced at AVM Studios, Chennai. Sets that resembled dense forests and caves were replicated. In an interview with The Times of India in Chennai, director Vikram stated: "We have signed Ileana D'Cruz to do 24. It will be her re-launch in Tamil cinema. She has given us bulk dates from February 2010 for the second schedule of the film." In February 2010, Vikram Kumar officially announced that he had dropped the film. Vikram clarified that he fine-tuned the film script but it was rejected by actor Vikram and the film producer. Further, the other reason cited was that the director had failed to provide the complete script even while production expenses were increasing. Due to difference of opinions, the director voluntarily walked out and stated that he had been making changes in the script and would approach a leading actor in future.

Development 

In August 2014, Suriya's production company 2D Entertainment announced the project through their official Twitter handle. In October 2014, A. R. Rahman was announced as the film soundtrack and score composer. Actor Suriya was confirmed as the male lead. The main plot of the revived project was the same as the one narrated to actor Vikram, but over the years, Vikram Kumar changed the screenplay with new dimensions in narration. In an interview Suriya pointed the core of the plot stating: "The one thing that humans cannot control is "time" but what if one has the power to do so. This is the core theme of the film 24."

Characters 
Actor Suriya played triple roles in the film, with five appearances. One of the roles being that of an antagonist, five to six looks were designed for him. The antagonist character "Athreya" is a wicked, yet smart guy who goes to any extent to fulfill his desires. The producers had potential discussions with Catherine Tresa for the lead female role before Samantha Ruth Prabhu was finalised in February 2015. In July 2015, Nithya Menen was roped to play the other leading character. Characters played by Samantha and Nithya in the film are of contrasting nature though both play love interest opposite Suriya. Samantha plays the love interest opposite to the character "Mani" whereas Nithya Menen to the character "Sethuraman". Saranya Ponvannan plays the role of a mother of the character "Mani".

Filming 
Principal photography commenced in Mumbai on 8 April 2015. A romantic song was filmed in Nashik by early June 2015. Certain scenes were filmed at Filmistaan studios in Goregaon. VFX works were also carried out in the same studio by September 2015. Nithya Menen began filming her portions in the city from 1 August 2015. The first schedule was completed by early September 2015. By mid of the same month, a twenty-day schedule began in Poland. The crew filmed action scenes and songs at Kraków, the Zborow Mountain, Zakopane, Leba, Lewin Klodzki, Jedlina Zdroj, Wałbrzych, Bulowice and Nowe Brzesko–all in Poland. The lights were provided by Kraków Company Cinelight. The Kraków Film Commission and Kraków Film Cluster supported the project in Poland. This second schedule of filming was wrapped up on 30 September 2015. On 26 October 2015, the team shot an important sequences in Subrata Roy Sahara Stadium in Pune. The shoot was completed in a single day. By the end of the same month, the last schedule of filming was done at Adithyaram Studios in Chennai. On 2 November 2015, the filming was completed.

In all, the film was shot for over 100 days, out of which 30 days of work was done abroad. More than 60 percent of the film involves VFX.

Music

The film score and soundtrack album are composed by A. R. Rahman. The lyrics to the songs are written by Vairamuthu and Madhan Karky. The soundtrack album was released by Eros Music on 9 April 2016.

Release 
The film was released on an estimated 1,950–2,000 screens worldwide. The screen count in United States was 267, with special premieres held on 5 May 2016. The states of Andhra Pradesh and Telangana shared 425 plus screens between them.

Marketing 
A game titled 24: Athreya Run which was created by Creative Monkey Games was released through application distribution platforms iOS App Store and Google Playstore on 1 May 2016.

Critical response

India
In his review for The Hindu, critic Baradwaj Rangan called 24 an "intelligent, joyous mix of sci-fi and masala-myth." Sreedhar Pillai in his review for Firstpost mentioned, "24 is a classy commercial entertainer, which has its moments." Malini Mannath of The New Indian Express wrote, "Attractively packaged, 24 is refreshing, novel and worth a watch." M. Suganth of The Times of India, assigned 4 out of 5 stars, stating: "It is not often that we see a big star choosing to take a risk with a script that is not simplistic or formulaic, especially when his last few films have underperformed at the box office, but here Suriya pulls it off admirably." IndiaGlitz.com rated the film 3.3 out of 5 and called it as "A beautiful and brilliant show of Time" For The Indian Express, Goutham VS wrote: "Suriya’s ‘Athreya’ is a role to remember for years to come. Director Vikram Kumar needs to be applauded for handling such a complex multi-layered screenplay." He gave the film 3.5 stars out of 5. Critic based at India Today, Kirubhakar Purushothaman praised the director, calling him the hero of the film. He extended his review by assigning 3.5 stars (out of 5). In her review for Daily News and Analysis, Latha Srinivasan stated, "Actor Suriya gives a stellar performance in this tale of time travel! Vikram Kumar's '24' is a visually stunning film with a novel concept." She gave the film 3.5 stars out of 5. A 3.5 star (out of 5) generalized review by Indo-Asian News Service mentioned that the "Suriya starrer is truly ambitious". Critical review board based at Behindwoods said: "24 is all about Suriya. Every emotion is portrayed in his point of view; from love to comedy to pain to revenge, it all comes under his coverage as he plays three important roles in the film." They assigned the film 3.25 stars out of 5. In her review published by The Deccan Chronicle, Anupama Subramaniam called the film a "well executed and intelligently woven sci-fi thriller." She gave the film 3 stars out of 5. Subha Shetty Saha, in her review for Mid-Day stated, "24 is a fantastic attempt at sci-fi genre of filmmaking and also belies a lot of hard work and thought that have gone into this at the screenplay stage." She gave the film 3 stars out of 5. S Saraswathi of Rediff felt, "24 is a cleverly crafted entertainer that is worth your time and money." Gautaman Bhaskaran of the Hindustan Times gave the film 2.5 stars out of 5, claiming: "The Sathya-Mani romance is silly to the core, and drags the narrative down by several notches, though uniformly fine performances by Menen, Samantha and Suriya come as magic relief."Sify rated 3 out of 5 stars stating "Straight off the bat Vikram Kumar's Suriya sci-fi film 24 is a well executed thinking movie within the commercial format."

Overseas
J Hurtado of Twitch commented on the film, "24 is about as high concept as masala entertainers come, it never forgets its purpose is to thrill its audience and give them what they paid for. It is a breathless, inventive, romantic, action packed adventure that is packed to the gills with surprises and joy." Mythily Ramachandran, in her review for Gulf News concluded that the film was an entertaining ride and went on to say, "The time-travelling film wins with superb and often hilarious performances by its leading actors."

Box office

India
At , the collections from Telangana and AP were equal to that from Tamil Nadu during the opening weekend.

Overseas
The film grossed over $1 million in three days on 161 screens in the United States. In the U. A. E. and Australia, the film earned $200,000 and AUD187,000 respectively during the same period. The film grossed $1.6 million in the United States in its lifetime.

Possible sequel 
The film's trailer, teaser and the first look posters featured Suriya as a paraglider. However, the paragliding sequences were removed by the film editor due to time constraints. In an interview, the editor stated that paragliding is Mani's (character played by Suriya) hobby and was supposed to be featured as an introductory scene for Mani. Later, he stated that the deleted scene would be featured in the sequel of the film; planned as 24 Decoded.
In a scene where Sethu throws the watch away on Priya's request, an Eagle which effected key events in both Mani and Sethu's timelines was seen flying over the watch implying a continuation of the Butterfly effect it caused previously thus forming the basis for a sequel.

Legal issues
The title 24 was in a legal tussle when actor Anil Kapoor planned an action against the production house 2D Entertainment as the official look and logo of the film title seemed similar to the American TV series 24, for which Kapoor had bought the remake rights from 20th Century Fox International TV. Kapoor held the rights of the 192 episodes for a period of four years extendable to another ten years. His lawyers defended the case, stating that Kapoor holds one of the highest licensee deals for a fiction format. A legal action was planned against Suriya and his production house 2D Entertainment but was settled in April 2015.

Accolades 
The film received two Awards at the 2017 Vikatan Awards  Best Visual Effects for Julian Trousselliar and Best Art Direction for Amit and Subrata. It won two awards  Best Cinematography and Best Production Design   at the 64th National Film Awards.

Notes

References

External links

2010s Tamil-language films
2016 science fiction action films
Indian science fiction action films
Films scored by A. R. Rahman
Films directed by Vikram Kumar
Films about time travel
Films set in 1990
Films shot in Chennai
Films shot in Kazakhstan
Films set in Tamil Nadu
Films shot in Tamil Nadu
Films shot in Maharashtra
Films shot in Karnataka
Films shot in Kraków
Films whose cinematographer won the Best Cinematography National Film Award
Films whose production designer won the Best Production Design National Film Award